Sycamore Mineral Springs Resort is a resort located in San Luis Obispo County, California. It is located near Avila Beach. This resort is mostly known for its mineral springs, but also has several different activities.

External links
 http://www.sycamoresprings.com/

Buildings and structures in San Luis Obispo County, California
Tourist attractions in San Luis Obispo County, California
Hotels in California